Poola Rangadu may refer to:
 Poola Rangadu (1967 film), an Indian Telugu-language crime thriller film
 Poola Rangadu (2012 film), an Indian Telugu-language action comedy film